KRMS may refer to:

 KRMS (AM), a radio station (1150 AM) licensed to serve Osage Beach, Missouri, United States
 KRMS-FM, a radio station (93.5 FM) licensed to serve Osage Beach, Missouri
 KRMS-LD, a low-power television station (channel 32) licensed to serve Lake Ozark, Missouri; see List of television stations in Missouri